Hania Aamir (born 12 February 1997) is a Pakistani actress who appears in Urdu television and films. She began her acting career with the Pakistani comedy film Janaan (2016) and received a Lux Style Award nomination for Best Supporting Actress. Aamir rose to notability with the role of beauty-obsessed unfaithful wife in Titli (2017) and girl next door in Visaal (2018).

She achieved further success by featuring in the comedy drama Na Maloom Afraad 2 (2017), and the aerial combat-war Parwaaz Hai Junoon (2018), both of which rank among one of highest-grossing Pakistani films and drew praise for her portrayal in the 2019 romantic Anaa.

Early life and family 
Aamir was born on 12 February 1997 in Rawalpindi, Punjab, Pakistan. She was rumoured to be in a relationship with singer Asim Azhar, but denied it in a live session with Aima Baig in 2020.

Career

Early work (2015–2018) 
Aamir was studying at the Foundation for Advancement of Science and Technology (FAST-NUCES), when she auditioned for the romantic comedy Janaan (2016), a film produced by the debutante filmmaker Imran Kazmi. Upon release, the film received positive reviews and was a commercial success. Her role of a mischievous Pashtun girl was appreciated and receive her nomination in Lux Style Award for Best Supporting Actress.

Aamir subsequently starred as a beauty-obsessed unfaithful wife in the 2017 romantic drama Titli. The series was the modern adaption of the novel Beauty and the Beast, and aired on Urdu 1. The success of the series proved a breakthrough for her, earning her wide public recognition. Her performance in the Hum TV's romantic drama Phir Wohi Mohabbat (2017), earned her the Best Television Sensation Female at the Hum Awards. That same year, Aamir played a headstrong bride-to-be in the year's highest-grossing release, the heist comedy Na Maloom Afraad 2. The film, a sequel to the 2014 romantic comedy film Na Maloom Afraad, The following year, Aamir featured in the Haseeb Hassan-directed Parwaaz Hai Junoon, an ensemble aerial combat-war drama alongside Hamza Ali Abbasi, Ahad Raza Mir and Kubra Khan. As her previous release, it emerged as a major critical and commercial success and both the films rank among the highest-grossing Pakistani films. Aamir's next portrayal was of a girl next door in the ARY Digital's melodrama Visaal (2018), opposite Zahid Ahmed and Saboor Aly.

Rise to prominence (2019–present) 

She played the free-spirited heiress of a fictional city Shergarh in the romantic-drama Anaa (2019) opposite Shehzad Sheikh. In addition to acting, she along with Sahir Ali Bagga, also sang the title track of the series which has garnered 8 million views on YouTube.

In 2020, she starred in the romantic Ishqiya portraying Romaisa Siddique opposite Feroze Khan. The  for which she received a nomination for Best Actress TV in 2nd Pakistan International Screen Awards. The same year she portraying a flirty girl, Sanam in Momina Duraid's Dil Ruba.

In 2021, she was seen portraying Hala Hamza in the family-drama Mere Humsafar opposite Farhan Saeed. The serial garnered immense TRPs and huge popularity not only in Pakistan but also in Bangladesh, India and Nepal. In 2022, she was seen portraying Gul Meena opposite Zaviyar Ijaz. The serial received praise from critics due to its script but was faulted for stereotypical portrayals of Pakhtoons. It went off air on 3 July 2022.

Filmography

Films

Television

Telefilm

Awards and nominations

References

External links 
 
 

Living people
21st-century Pakistani actresses
Pakistani female models
Pakistani television actresses
Pakistani film actresses
Actresses from Rawalpindi
Actresses in Pashto cinema
Actresses in Urdu cinema
National University of Computer and Emerging Sciences alumni
1997 births